Georg Olden may refer to:

Georg Olden (actor) (born 1968), American child/teen actor
Georg Olden (graphic designer) (1920–1975), American designer